Diana Leblanc (born 1943) is a Canadian television and film actress, best known to US audiences for her portrayal of Frannie Halcyon in the TV miniseries More Tales of the City (1998) and its follow-up Further Tales of the City (2001). These miniseries were sequels to Tales of the City (1994), which starred Nina Foch in the role of Frannie.

Early life and education 
Leblanc was born in Montreal and enrolled in the French program at the National Theatre School of Canada, switching to the English program in her second year. She was a founding member of the Soulpepper Theatre Company in Toronto and a member of the Neptune Theatre company in Halifax. Leblanc was artistic director for the Théâtre français de Toronto.

Career 
Leblanc had roles in the films Mahoney's Last Stand, Lies My Father Told Me and The Third Walker and the television series Swiss Family Robinson. She played Grace Elliott, the mother of Pierre Trudeau, in the 2005 television miniseries Trudeau II: Maverick in the Making. She also appeared in the television series North of 60.

As a director, she has worked not only in the theatre but in radio, directing 75 one-minute radio dramas for the Bronfman Heritage Minutes series, when it evolved from film into radio. Leblanc has directed at the Stratford Shakespeare Festival including a 1994 production of Long Day's Journey into Night, at the National Arts Centre in Ottawa, at the Segal Centre for Performing Arts in Montreal and at the Tarragon Theatre in Toronto. She has also directed productions for the Canadian Opera Company, Calgary Opera, Pacific Opera Victoria and the International Opera Centrum in Amsterdam. She continues to work in Toronto theatre as a director.

In 2015, Leblanc received a Governor General's Performing Arts Award for Lifetime Artistic Achievement, Canada's highest honour in the performing arts, for her work in theatre. She has also received the Gascon-Thomas Award from the National Theatre School of Canada and a Gemini Award.

Filmography

Film

Television

References

External links
 

1943 births
Living people
Canadian television actresses
Canadian film actresses
20th-century Canadian actresses
21st-century Canadian actresses
Actresses from Montreal
National Theatre School of Canada alumni
Governor General's Performing Arts Award winners
Canadian theatre directors
Canadian artistic directors